Beriotisia taniae is a moth of the family Noctuidae. It is only known from the Maule Region in Chile.

The wingspan is about 35 mm. Adults are on wing in January.

External links
 Noctuinae of Chile

Noctuinae
Endemic fauna of Chile